Aaron "Splash" Nelson-Moody (Tawx'sin Yexwulla, born 14 April 1967) is a Squamish carver working in the Coast Salish tradition.  Nelson-Moody's works include the doors to the B.C.-Canada pavilion at the 2006 Winter Olympic Games in Turin.  He also creates Coast Salish based jewellery.

Nelson-Moody's Squamish name of Tawx'sin Yexwulla means "Splashing Eagle" giving rise to his nickname of "Splash".  He started as a carver, but branched out to jewelry when he looked for local Coast Salish jewelry for his wife but found little, and decided to make it.

Nelson-Moody was commissioned to work on the doors for the Turin Winter Olympics a year before their installation.  The doors were made from red cedar.  Based on a Coast Salish legend, the doors feature an eagle with a sun rising out.

See also
 List of First Nations people

References

External links

1967 births
Living people
20th-century First Nations sculptors
Canadian male sculptors
20th-century Canadian male artists
21st-century Canadian sculptors
21st-century Canadian male artists
21st-century First Nations people
Artists from Vancouver
Coast Salish woodcarvers